The 2013 Asian Five Nations, known as the 2013 HSBC Asian 5 Nations due to the tournament's sponsorship by the HSBC, was the 26th Asian Five Nations rugby union tournament, and the sixth since it was rebranded from the Asian Rugby Championship in 2008. Japan won the title for the 21st time, conceding just eight points in the entire tournament compared to a total of 316 scored. The UAE finished last and was relegated for the following season.

Changes from 2012
 Kazakhstan has been replaced with Philippines, who earns promotion from Division 1.

Teams
The teams involved are:

Final table

Fixtures

References

External links
Official Website

Asian
2013
Five Nations
Five Nations
2013 in South Korean sport
2013 in Hong Kong sport
2013 in Philippine sport
2013 in Emirati sport